Sergeyevka (Härgäy) is a rural locality (a village) in Nugushevsky Selsoviet, Meleuzovsky District, Bashkortostan, Russia. The population was 191 as of 2010. There are 12 streets.

Geography 
Sergeyevka is located 48 km northeast of Meleuz (the district's administrative centre) by road. Nugush is the nearest rural locality.

References 

Rural localities in Meleuzovsky District